Orienteering USA (OUSA), formerly United States Orienteering Federation (USOF),  is the national governing body for orienteering in the United States. It is recognized by the International Orienteering Federation and the United States Olympic Committee. It was founded on 1 August 1971. Orienteering USA is a 501(c)(3) non-profit organization. There are 68 current member clubs and over 1,500 members.

History
The first known competitive orienteering events in the U.S. were held from 1941 to 1943 in New Hampshire by a Finnish army officer named Piltti Heiskanen. There were military orienteering events at West Point Military Academy in New York state by 1966 and at Quantico Marine Base in Virginia by 1967, where the Marine Corps Physical Fitness Academy's first public event was held on July 12, 1968 on Harald Wibye's color orienteering map, the first such map in the English-speaking world. This was also the origin of the Quantico Orienteering Club, currently the largest and most active club in the US. The Norwegian Wibye also hosted the first known public competitive orienteering event in the U.S. at Valley Forge in Pennsylvania on Nov. 5, 1967. From this event would emerge another large club in the U.S., the Delaware Valley Orienteering Association.

The most influential early benefactor to and promoter of U.S. map and compass use and orienteering, and easily the most well-read author on these topics, was Bjorn Kjellstrom, a 1930s Swedish orienteering champion. From his events with scouts as early as 1946 to his guidance and support in the 1990s, he provided impetus and inspiration. His map and compass events from 1965 to 1967 in Westchester County, NY had competitive orienteering courses added in 1968 by Wibye. Bill Gookin's first events in 1969 in the San Diego area were the earliest known competitive public orienteering events west of the Mississippi. Kjellstrom assisted several Quantico officers is establishing the U.S. Orienteering Federation in 1971. The early 1970s would see the founding, in part, by orienteering book author Hans Bengstsson, of the New England Orienteering Club, the largest in the U.S. from the late 1970s through the 1980s.

Organization
Orienteering USA is predominantly a volunteer-run organization. It has a Board of Directors, officers and numerous committees and task forces.

OUSA states that its mission is to:

 Increase participation in the sport.
 Teach map reading and navigation skills.
 Promote enjoyment of, and respect for, the environment.
 Establish world-class competitive excellence within our national team programs.

Affiliated clubs

References

External links
 

USA
Orienteering
501(c)(3) organizations
Orienteering in the United States